Zahir Carrington (born March 12, 1988) is an American basketball player who most recently played as a member of Princeton 3X3 and Chicago 3x3 in the FIBA 3X3 World Tour.

High school 
Carrington was a first-team All-Public League, third-team All-City, first-team All-Daily News, and Labor Union All-Star selection in his senior season after averaging 19 points, 11 rebounds, and two blocks per game.

College career 
As a freshman with Lehigh, Carrington averaged 5.4 points and 3.4 rebounds per game and was named a Patriot League All-Rookie team selection.  His junior year, he averaged 14 points and 8.6 rebounds per game, led the Patriot League in rebounds, recorded 10 double-doubles was named Second-Team All-Patriot League selection and Second-Team All-District selection.  Carrington earned All Patriot League honors in 2008, 2009, and 2010. He was team captain his junior and senior seasons, including for the 2010 Patriot League Championship Team, and was named the 2010 Patriot League Tournament Most Valuable Player.

Career statistics

Professional career 
Carrington averaged 21 points, 11 rebounds, and 2.5 blocks per game for the ABA's New Jersey Express in 2010–11. Carrington also played as a member of Princeton 3x3 and part of the team's 2017 U.S. National Championship squad who participated in the FIBA 3x3 2017 World Cup.

References

External links 
 FIBA 3X3WT Profile
 Real GM Profile

1988 births
Living people
American men's basketball players
Basketball players from Philadelphia
Lehigh Mountain Hawks men's basketball players
Small forwards